The Fort Wayne Summer Cash Spiel was a bonspiel, or curling tournament, that took place at the Lutheran Health Sportscenter in Fort Wayne, Indiana. The tournament was held in a round robin format. The tournament has been held as part of the men's and women's Ontario Curling Tour, and was part of the World Curling Tour in 2013. It has not been run since.

Past champions

Men

Women

Mixed

External links

Former World Curling Tour events
Ontario Curling Tour events
Sports in Fort Wayne, Indiana
Curling competitions in the United States
Curling in Indiana
2011 establishments in Indiana
2013 disestablishments in Indiana
Recurring sporting events established in 2011
Recurring sporting events disestablished in 2013